The 1912 World Hard Court Championships (WHCC) (French: Championnats du Monde de Tennis sur Terre Battue) was the inaugural edition of the World Hard Court Championships tennis tournament, considered as the precursor to the French Open, and was held on the clay courts of the Stade Français at the Parc de Saint-Cloud in Paris from 1 June through 9 June 1912. This tournament was open to all international amateur tennis players and was part of a series of world championships being advanced by the International Lawn Tennis Federation (ILTF), the others being the World Grass Court Championships (Wimbledon) and the World Covered Court Championships held in a variety of countries. The WHCC was open to all nationalities unlike the French Championships which were open only to tennis players who were licensed in France.

The 1912 WHCC consisted of a men's singles, men's doubles, women's singles and mixed doubles event. The women's doubles event was not scheduled. The singles titles were won by Otto Froitzheim and Marguerite Broquedis.

Finals

Men's singles

 Otto Froitzheim defeated  Oscar Kreuzer, 6–2, 7–5, 4–6, 7–5

Women's singles

 Marguerite Broquedis defeated  Mieken Rieck, 6–3, 0–6, 6–4

Men's doubles

 Otto Froitzheim /  Oscar Kreuzer defeated  Harold Kitson /  Charles Winslow, 4–6, 6–2, 6–1, 6–3

Mixed doubles

 Max Decugis /  Anne de Borman defeated  Heinrich Kleinschroth /  Mieken Rieck, 6–4, 7–5

References

External links
 Excerpt from "Histoires vraies du tennis" (PDF)

World Hard Court Championships
World Hard Court Championships
World Hard Court Championships
June 1912 sports events
1912 in French tennis